Lanc may refer to:


Organizations
 National-Christian Defense League, a Romanian political party
 National Liberation Movement (Albania) (Albanian:  or LANÇ), an Albanian World War II resistance organization

People
 Arthur Lanc (1907–1995), Austrian medical officer during World War II who was named Righteous among the Nations for protecting Jews from the Holocaust
 Erwin Lanc (born 1930), Austrian politician
 Maria Lanc (1911–1995), Arthur Lanc's wife, also named Righteous among the Nations

Other uses
 Avro Lancaster, a British World War II heavy bomber aircraft nicknamed the Lanc
 LANC, a protocol by Sony used to synchronize camcorders and cameras

See also 
 Lancs (disambiguation)
 Lank (disambiguation)